Psihijatrija danas (in English: Nowadays Psychiatry, or literally Psychiatry Today) is a biannual peer-reviewed academic journal and an official journal of the Psychiatric Association of Serbia. The editor-in-chief is Dušica Lecic-Tosevski. It is published by the Institute of Mental Health (Belgrade).

Abstracting and indexing 
The journal is abstracted and indexed in PsycINFO and Psychological Abstracts.

References

External links 
 
 The 1st issue of the journal (Google Docs)
 

Psychiatry journals
Serbian-language journals
Biannual journals
Publications with year of establishment missing